Taoufik Ben Othman (born 24 March 1939) is a Tunisian football player and coach.

He began his career very young at the Avenir Sportif de La Marsa and joined the junior individual selections. In 1958-1959 he participated in the first promotion of his club among the elite and is still there to help win the cups and the lead if necessary. He holds a total of 55 international caps, and represented his country in the 1960 Summer Olympics.

Having coached several clubs, including Avenir Sportif de La Marsa and CA Bizerte, he was appointed assistant coach by Abdelmajid Chetali and contributes to the qualification of Tunisia to the World Cup 1978. He was named coach of the Tunisia national football team in 1987.

References 

1939 births
Living people
Tunisian footballers
AS Marsa players
Olympic footballers of Tunisia
Footballers at the 1960 Summer Olympics
Tunisia international footballers
1962 African Cup of Nations players
1963 African Cup of Nations players
Association football defenders
Tunisian football managers
AS Marsa managers
ES Hammam-Sousse managers
Olympique Béja managers
Club Athlétique Bizertin managers
Tunisia national football team managers
ES Zarzis managers
AS Kasserine managers